Job Sheldon (1849 – 28 September 1914) was an English-born Australian politician.

The son of medical practitioner James Sheldon and Elizabeth Stafford, he enlisted in the army at the age of eighteen and became the regiment's schoolmaster. He Married Elizabeth Sophie Bouchard around 1870; they had two daughters. A second marriage, on 5 August 1890 to Harriett Emily Halls, produced an unknown number of children. In 1882 Sheldon moved to New South Wales, where he lived with his uncle until moving to Narrabri to work as a clerk. In 1891 he was elected to the New South Wales Legislative Assembly for Namoi, representing the new Labor Party. Disagreements regarding the policy pledge result in his contesting the 1894 election unsuccessfully as a Protectionist. He became a land agent after leaving politics. Sheldon died at Petersham in 1914.

References

1849 births
1914 deaths
Members of the New South Wales Legislative Assembly
Australian Labor Party members of the Parliament of New South Wales
Protectionist Party politicians